Granity Pass lies in the Marino Mountains, within Kahurangi National Park, in New Zealand's South Island. It is located 5 km northeast of Mount Owen.

The pass is flanked by the slopes of the  Billies Knob (to the north) and  Mount Bell (to the south). 

The pass is crossed by the Lookout Range Route, one of several tramping tracks within Kahurangi National Park. An overnight hut, Granity Pass Hut, is located close to the banks of the Blue Creek to the west of the pass.

References

Mountain passes of New Zealand
Kahurangi National Park
Landforms of the West Coast, New Zealand